A three-chord song is a song whose music is built around three chords that are played in a certain sequence. A common type of three-chord song is the simple twelve-bar blues used in blues and rock and roll.

Typically, the three chords used are the chords on the tonic, subdominant, and dominant (scale degrees I, IV and V): in the key of C, these would be the C, F and G chords. Sometimes the V7 chord is used instead of V, for greater tension.

The I (tonic), IV (subdominant) and V (dominant) chords (primary triads) together encompass all seven tones of the tonic's major scale. These three chords are a simple means of covering many melodies without the use of passing notes.

 The order of the chord progression may be varied; popular chord progression variations using the I, IV and V chords of a scale are:  
 V – I – IV  
 I – V – IV – V  
 V – IV – I  
Beside the I, IV and V chord progression, other widely used 3-chord progressions are:
 I – vi – V
 I – ii – V
In the mid-1960s, two of the most popular bands, The Beach Boys and The Beatles, began releasing songs that stretched the scope of rock and roll beyond three-chord songs.  Even their earlier hits, such as "The Warmth of the Sun", or "She Loves You", featured chord progressions that were somewhat more complex.  This led to a movement away from the country and blues base of rock and roll music, towards what would be termed simply rock music, and eventually resulted in the development of progressive rock and its many derivatives. However, the popularity of the three-chord song has always remained, particularly in punk rock, where the Ramones pioneered the three barre chord approach on their debut album Ramones, although on this album there were songs with five, six or seven chords.

Quotes
Songwriter Harlan Howard once said "country music is three chords and the truth."

Lou Reed said "One chord is fine. Two chords is pushing it. Three chords and you're into jazz." Reed nevertheless wrote many songs with unique or complex chord progressions himself, such as the material on Berlin.

See also
 Cadence (music)
 I–V–vi–IV progression
 Twelve-bar blues
Bergamask

References

Harmony
Song forms
Chord progressions